Red Meat is a weekly three panel black-and-white comic strip by Max Cannon. First published in 1989, it has appeared in over 80 newspapers, mainly alternative weeklies and college papers in the United States and in other countries. It has been available online since November 1996.

Style 
A visual hallmark of the strip is the almost total lack of movement of the characters from panel to panel, and a "featureless void" of no background. Cannon has said that he wanted Red Meat "to have a look that was somewhere between clip art and arresting minimalism, so that the text was more important than the art itself".

Lambiek's Comiclopedia describes Red Meat as "a collection of absurd and sometimes cruel comics". In 1996, Cannon  described the essence of the strip as 

Red Meat features unrelated "slug lines" at the top of each comic, which Canon explains as "That's just my own form of personal poetry. It's a little something extra for those who don't like comics, but who love the English language." In 2005, his favorites included "Plastic fruit for a starving nation" and "Official pace car of the apocalypse."

Characters 
Red Meat's features an extensive cast of characters with unusual characteristics and personalities, described by Spike Magazine as "small town America, [populated] entirely with grotesques." Many of the strip's human characters are 1950s caricatures, with Cannon commenting "Several of the characters are designed to have the look of late '50s, early 60s, real pleasant advertising art."
 Bug-Eyed Earl – A demented person, resembling Edgar Allan Poe and Steve Buscemi. Earl's appearances generally involve him telling a surreal, strange, and sometimes disgusting anecdote.
 Milkman Dan – The local milkman; he is eccentric and hostile towards people and animals, and constantly battles sobriety. Dan also dresses as a cow in the part of McMoo, the anti-drug cow.  Cannon said that "Milkmen seem so wholesome, and there’s no way anybody can be that wholesome… I grew up in a military family, and there’s something about that military-style uniform, all cleaned up, a brutal control effort the military necessarily breeds."
Karen: A neighborhood child who acts as Milkman Dan's nemesis, alternately being the victim or perpetrator of cruel pranks and gibes, described by Cannon as a "spoiled little brat." 
 Ted Johnson – Cannon has stated that Ted is based on his own father, and said that–despite some readers thinking so–he is not based on Bob Dobbs. He has a taste for sexual fetishes and unusual hobbies.
Ted's Wife: A foil for Ted who appears almost entirely as speech bubbles originating off-panel.
Ted's Son: One of Ted's children, the victim of/participant in many of Ted's antics.
Johnny Lemonhead: A man with a large lemon-shaped head portrayed as having correspondingly yellow skin in color strips.
Papa Moai: A godlike multi-dimensional entity in the shape of a living Easter Island Moai.
Mister Wally: An older, bearded, balding man who acts as proprietor of a tobacconist when not appearing shirtless in public.
The Old Cowboy: A man smoking a cigarette while leaning against a fence, wearing a cowboy hat and boots, who delivers monologues or converses with characters off-panel.
Priest: a Catholic priest who stands, looking up, while carrying on conversations with God.
Stubbo: a stubbled caricature of Sluggo Smith from the Nancy comic strip.

Publication 
Red Meat has a weekly release schedule. In 1989, after extensive prompting by his friend Joe Forkan, Cannon began producing the strip on a Macintosh SE using Adobe Illustator. It was initially published in 1989 by the Arizona Daily Wildcat, the student newspaper of the University of Arizona, though Cannon was no longer a student of the university at the time. Two months later, it was picked up by the Tucson Weekly.  Since then it has appeared over 80 publications, including The Onion. Red Meat is also available online, and has been published online since November 1996,  making it one of the oldest still-running webcomics.

Red Meat has been published in several other languages, including French, Italian, Spanish, Danish, and Finnish. Localisers have changed some details, such as the Finnish translation making Milkman Dan into a mailman.

In 2009, Max Cannon urged his readers to contact the editors of their local alternative weekly papers in an effort to save the comics printed within. In a move applauded by Tom Tomorrow, of the weekly strip This Modern World, Red Meat returned to the pages of OC Weekly in 2012 after having been dropped in 2009.

At least three collections of the strips have been released:
 Red Meat (1997) 
 More Red Meat (1998) 
 Red Meat Gold (2005)

Reception 
Bill Griffith, writing in the Boston Globe, identified the strip as a noteworthy example of "compelling comics on newsprint" in 1996. Matt Groening of Life in Hell, praised the strip with "In a culture full of sick, twisted, perverted art, Red Meat is up there at the top—it's that good." Spike Magazine described the strip as "a window into a parallel world that is uncomfortably close to the real one." Writing in The New York Times, John Hodgeman described the strip as "a bracing, bitter tonic -- the antidote to comics-page malaise, albeit one that might kill before it cures" and said that it was typified by "the baroquely dark imaginings that make Cannon's work more than a tiresome anti-comic."

Author 
Max Cannon was born into a U.S. Air Force family (his father being a B-52 bomber pilot) on 16 July 1962 in Hunstanton, England, and spent his early years in England and Italy, before moving to Tucson, Arizona in 1977. He attended the University of Arizona, majoring in fine arts. Lambiek's Comiclopedia states that Cannon was born in England, but the Tucson Weekly described him as a "native Tucsonan".

Cannon is also creator of the eight-episode Comedy Central animated web show Shadow Rock, which was based on the Red Meat strip. He also contributed to Marvel's Strange Tales #2 & #3, writing stories with Spider-Man and the Fantastic Four, respectively. In a 2009 interview, Cannon said that he taught college animation and was working on two screenplays and doing some preliminary writing on a graphic novel. From 2008 to 2014 Canon worked as an instructor at the Southwest University of Visual Arts, and from 2014 to 2016 he worked as an adjunct instructor at The Art Institute of Tucson. He has also been a hospital worker, and reported on his experiences during the COVID-19 pandemic.

References

External links 
 

1990s webcomics
2000s webcomics
1989 comics debuts
American comic strips
Black comedy comics
Surreal comedy
Webcomics in print